The Santiago-Batuco commuter rail is a  commuter rail line under construction in the Chilean capital Santiago, projected to open in 2024.

Background
The original Santiago–Valparaíso railway line opened in 1863 via Batuco, and closed to passengers in 1987.
In May 2019 Chile's president,  Sebastián Piñera announces plans for a commuter rail line running north from Quilicura, on an extension of Santiago Metro Line 3, to Batuco and eventually Tiltil. The Ministry of Transport states that a basic engineering study was completed for the scheme in December 2017. The ministry also stated it was due to respond in July 2019 to an environmental evaluation that commenced at the end of the 2017.

Stations
Quinta Normal 
Matucana 
Renca
Quilicura 
Las Industrias
Valle Grande
Colina
Batuco

References

Transport in Chile
Rail transport in Chile
Proposed railway lines